Dragonmarked is a supplement to the 3.5 edition of the Dungeons & Dragons role-playing game.

Contents
Dragonmarked is an accessory for the Eberron setting that details each of the thirteen dragonmarked houses and presents advice for playing dragonmarked character within a house or house guild. The book introduces new options for dragonmarked player characters, including prestige classes, feats, and spells. The book also discusses aberrant dragonmarks and their role in the campaign.

Publication history
Dragonmarked was written by Keith Baker, C.A. Suleiman, and Michelle Lyons, and published in November 2006. Cover art was by Wayne Reynolds, with interior art by Mitch Cotie, Rick Drennan, Gonzalo Flores, Tomás Giorello, John Hodgson, Fred Hooper, Ron Lemen, Howard Lyon, Warren Mahy, Lucio Parrillo, and Anne Stokes.

Reception

Reviews
The Geek Gazette (Issue 5 - Feb 2007)

External links
product info

References

Eberron supplements
Role-playing game supplements introduced in 2006